A circle hook is a type of fish hook which is sharply curved back in a circular shape. It has become widely used among anglers in recent years because the hook generally catches more fish and is rarely swallowed. Since the circle hook catches the fish on the lips at the corner of its mouth, it usually decreases the mortality rates of released fish as compared to J-hook (like O'Shaughnessy or Octopus hooks) which are often swallowed by the fish, causing damage to the gills or vital organs.
The circle hook's shape allows it to only hook onto an exposed surface, which in the case of a fish means the corner of its mouth.  The fish takes the baited hook and swallows it, and as the hook is reeled in, it is safely pulled out of the fish until it reaches the mouth.  At this point it will catch the corner of the mouth, resulting in fewer gut-hooked fish.

It is important not to perform a traditional hookset when a fish bites; rather, just begin reeling in. Performing a typical hookset while using a circle hook often results in the hook being pulled out of the fish altogether.

Studies have shown that circle hooks do less damage to billfish than the traditional J-hooks, yet they are just as effective for catching billfish. This is good for conservation, since it improves survival rates after release.

Difference between J-Hook and circle hook 
J-hook has a rounded throat, an upward-facing point, a straight medium-sized shank that is slightly longer than the point, and a small brazed eye. Circle hooks have a circular bend, a medium-length shank, and a sharp inward-facing point.

Notes

References
 Promjinda S, Somboon Siriraksophon S, Narupon Darumas N and Phithak Chaidee P (2008) Efficiency of the Circle Hook in Comparison with J-Hook in Longline Fishery The Ecosystem-Based Fishery Management in the Bay of Bengal, pp. 167–180.

External links
 Hooking fish on circles Stuff. Updated 24 November 2011., Retrieved 28 January 2012.

Fishing equipment